The 1953 New Hampshire Wildcats football team was an American football team that represented the University of New Hampshire as a member of the Yankee Conference during the 1953 college football season. In its fifth year under head coach Chief Boston, the team compiled a 6–2 record (3–1 against conference opponents) and tied for the Yankee Conference championship.

Schedule

References

New Hampshire
New Hampshire Wildcats football seasons
New Hampshire Wildcats football